Struttin' Our Stuff is the first studio album from Bill Wyman's Rhythm Kings.

Track listing
"Green River"
"Walking on My Own"
"Melody"
"Stuff (Can't Get Enough)"
"Bad to Be Alone"
"I'm Mad"
"Down in the Bottom"
"Motorvatin' Mama"
"Jitterbug Boogie"
"Going Crazy Overnight"
"Hole in My Soul"
"Tobacco Road"

Personnel
 Bill Wyman – bass guitar, vocals
 Frank Mead, Martin Drover, Nick Payn, Andy Hamilton, Nick Pentelow, Andy Mackintosh, Derek Watkins, Pete Beachill - brass
 Graham Broad - drums
 Gary Brooker - electric piano, vocals
Max Middleton - piano on "Green River" and "Tobacco Road"
Dave Hartley - piano, organ
 Terry Taylor - guitar, acoustic guitar, vocals
 Albert Lee - guitar on "Walking On My Own", "Motorvatin' Mama", "Jitterbug Boogie" and "Going Crazy Overnight"
 Georgie Fame - Hammond organ, vocals
Martin Taylor - lead guitar on "Bad to Be Alone"
Eric Clapton - lead guitar on "Melody"
Peter Frampton - lead guitar on "Tobacco Road"
Geoff Grange - harmonica on "Down in the Bottom"
Ray Cooper - percussion on "Stuff (Can't Get Enough)" and "I'm Mad"
Geraint Watkins - vocals on "I'm Mad" and "Down in the Bottom"
Mike Sanchez - vocals on "Jitterbug Boogie"
Paul Carrack - vocals on "Tobacco Road"
 Beverley Skeete, Janice Hoyte - vocals, backing vocals
Keeley Smith, Melanie Richmond, Susie Webb, Zoe Nicholas, Natasha Kristie, Barbie Carey, Maggie Ryder - backing vocals
Technical
 Producer – Michael Au
 Executive Producer – Bernhard Roessle
Glyn Johns, Tony Taverner - mixing engineer
Stuart Epps - recording engineer
 Recorded By – Südwestrundfunk
Willi Kuper - cover photography

References

Bill Wyman's Rhythm Kings albums
1998 debut albums
Albums produced by Bill Wyman
BMG Rights Management albums